Kurdish Revolutionary Party was a political party in Iraq seeking independence for the Kurdish people. Originally formed in 1964, it merged into the Kurdish Democratic Party in 1970. The party was revived by a group of anti-Barzani dissidents in the KDP leadership in 1974. The refounded Kurdish Revolutionary Party joined the National Progressive Front and supported the Kurdish autonomy law proposed by the Iraqi government. The party was led by Abd as-Sattar Tahir Sharif, who left Iraq in 1999.

The party obtained two seats in the national parliament in the March 24, 1996, elections.

The party held its 14th national congress on August 21, 2000.

References

Kurdish nationalism in Iraq
Kurdish nationalist political parties
Kurdish political parties in Iraq
Political parties in Kurdistan Region